Suchomimus (meaning "crocodile mimic") is a genus of spinosaurid dinosaur that lived between 125 and 112 million years ago in what is now Niger, during the Aptian to early Albian stages of the Early Cretaceous period. It was named and described by palaeontologist Paul Sereno and colleagues in 1998, based on a partial skeleton from the Elrhaz Formation. Suchomimus's long and shallow skull, similar to that of a crocodile, earns it its generic name, while the specific name Suchomimus tenerensis alludes to the locality of its first remains, the Ténéré Desert.

Suchomimus was a relatively large theropod, reaching  in length and weighing . However, the age of the holotype specimen is uncertain, so it is unclear whether this size estimate would have been its maximum. The narrow skull of Suchomimus was perched on a short neck, and its forelimbs were powerfully built, bearing a giant claw on each thumb. Along the midline of the animal's back ran a low dorsal sail, built from the long neural spines of its vertebrae. Like other spinosaurids, it likely had a diet of fish and small prey animals.

Some palaeontologists consider the genus to be an African species of the European spinosaurid Baryonyx, B. tenerensis. Suchomimus might also be a junior synonym of the contemporaneous spinosaurid Cristatusaurus lapparenti, although the latter taxon is based on much more fragmentary remains. Suchomimus lived in a fluvial environment of vast floodplains alongside many other dinosaurs, in addition to pterosaurs, crocodylomorphs, fish, turtles, and bivalves.

Discovery and naming

In 1997, American palaeontologist Paul Sereno and his team at Gadoufaoua discovered Fossils that represented about two-thirds of a large theropod dinosaur skeleton in Niger. The first find, a giant thumb claw, was made on 4 December 1997 by David Varricchio. In 1998, Sereno, Allison Beck, Didier Dutheil, Boubacar Gado, Hans Larsson, Gabrielle Lyon, Jonathan Marcot, Oliver Rauhut, Rudyard Sadleir, Christian Sidor, David Varricchio, Gregory Wilson and Jeffrey Wilson named and described the type species Suchomimus tenerensis. The generic name Suchomimus ("crocodile mimic") is derived from the Ancient Greek σοῦχος, souchos, the Greek name for the Egyptian crocodile god Sobek, and μῖμος, mimos, "mimic", after the shape of the animal's head. The specific name tenerensis is after the Ténéré Desert where the animal was found.

The holotype, MNN GDF500, was found in the Tegama Beds of the Elrhaz Formation. It consists of a partial skeleton lacking the skull. It contains three neck ribs, parts of fourteen dorsal (back) vertebrae, ten dorsal ribs, gastralia (or "belly ribs"), pieces of three sacral vertebrae, parts of twelve caudal (tail) vertebrae, chevrons (bones that form the underside of the tail), a scapula (shoulder blade), a coracoid, a partial forelimb, most of the pelvis (hip bone), and parts of a hindlimb. The spinal column was largely articulated, the remainder consisted of disarticulated bones. Parts of the skeleton had been exposed on the desert surface and had suffered erosion damage. Additionally, several specimens have been assigned as paratypes: MNN GDF 501 to 508 include a snout, a quadrate from the back of the skull, three dentaries (tooth-bearing bones of the lower jaw), an axis (second neck vertebra), a rear cervical vertebra, and a rear dorsal vertebra. MNN GDF 510 to MNN GDF 511 comprise two caudal vertebrae. All of the original Suchomimus fossils are housed in the palaeontological collection of the Musée National du Niger. The initial description of Suchomimus was preliminary. In 2007, the furcula (wishbone)—found during an expedition in 2000—was described in detail.

S. tenerensis is potentially a junior synonym of another spinosaurid from the Elrhaz Formation, Cristatusaurus lapparenti, named the same year based on jaw fragments and vertebrae. The skull elements were considered indistinguishable from those of Baryonyx walkeri from the Barremian of England by British paleontologists Alan Charig and Angela Milner. In 1997 while describing S. tenerensis, Sereno and colleagues agreed with this assessment and concluded that Cristatusaurus was a dubious name. In 2002, the German palaeontologist Hans-Dieter Sues and colleagues concluded that Suchomimus was identical to Cristatusaurus lapparenti, and despite Cristatusaurus having been named somewhat earlier than Suchomimus, proposed them to represent a second species of Baryonyx called Baryonyx tenerensis. In a 2003 analysis, German paleontologist Oliver Rauhut concurred with this.

Description

Suchomimus and Baryonyx). The holotype of Suchomimus was considerably larger than that of Baryonyx, but the ages of the two individuals are not known.

Skull 

The jaws had about 122 conical teeth, pointed but not very sharp and curving slightly backwards, with fine serrations and wrinkled enamel. The tip of the snout was enlarged sideways and carried a "terminal rosette" of longer teeth, seven per side in the premaxillae and about the same number in the corresponding part of the lower jaw. Further back, there were at least 22 teeth per upper jaw side in the maxilla, while the entire lower jaw side carried 32 teeth in the dentary bone.

The upper jaw had a prominent kink just behind the rosette, protruding downwards; this convexly curved part of the maxilla had the longest teeth of the entire skull. The internal bone shelves of the maxillae met each other in the midline of the skull over a long distance, forming a closed secondary palate that stiffened the snout, and setting off the internal nostrils and palatal complex (including the pterygoid, palatine and ectopterygoid) towards the back of the skull. The nostrils, unlike in most theropods, were retracted further back on the skull and behind the premaxillary teeth. The external nares were long, narrow and horizontally positioned; the same was true of the larger antorbital fenestrae, a pair of bony openings in front of the eyes. The rear of the skull is poorly known but for a short quadrate bone, which had broad condyles (round protrusions) away from the centre of attachment and—like in the spinosaurid Baryonyx—had a large foramen (opening) separating it from the quadratojugal bone. The lower jaws were greatly elongated and narrow, forming a rigid structure as their dentaries touched each other at the midline, reinforcing the mandible against torsional (bending and twisting) forces.

Postcranial skeleton 

The neck was relatively short but well-muscled as shown by strong epipophyses (processes to which neck muscles attached). There were about sixteen dorsal vertebrae. Suchomimus had significantly extended neural spines—blade-shaped upward extensions on the vertebrae—which were elongated at the rear back. Those of the five sacral vertebrae were the longest. The elongation of these structures continued until the middle of the tail. The spines may have held up some kind of low crest or sail of skin that was highest over its hips, lower and extending further to the back than that of Spinosaurus, in which the sail reached its highest peak over the dorsal vertebrae. This condition was more reduced in Baryonyx.

The furcula was V-shaped and indicates a high and narrow trunk. The scapula had a rectangular acromion, or attachment site for clavicle (collarbone). The  (upper arm bone) was very strongly built, only equaled in size among non-spinosaurid theropods by that of Megalosaurus and Torvosaurus, with robust upper corners. The humerus had a boss (bone overgrowth) above the condyle that contacted its hook-shaped  (forearm bone). Only the third metacarpal (long bone of the hand) is known; showing a robust morphology (form). The  (pubic bone) had a front surface that was wider than the side surface, and its forward-facing lower end was flattened and rectangular, with a brief flange along the midline, in contrast to the expanded boot shape it had in other theropods. The ischium (lower and rearmost hip bone) bore a low obturator flange. Its  is markedly plate-like. In the ankle, the astralagus had an ascending process taller than that of Allosaurus.

Classification

The describers established some autapomorphies (unique derived traits) of Suchomimus to separate it from other theropods, including the expanded rear dorsal, sacral, and front caudal neural spines, the robust upper corners of the humerus, and the boss above the humerus' condyle that contacted its hook-shaped radius. Sereno and colleagues referred Suchomimus to the Spinosauridae and named two subfamilies within this clade, Baryonychinae (all spinosaurids more closely related to Baryonyx) and Spinosaurinae (all spinosaurids closer to Spinosaurus). Suchomimus was a member of the subfamily Baryonychinae. Apart from its apparently taller sail, Suchomimus was very similar to the spinosaurid Baryonyx from the Barremian of England, and shared traits with it such as the reduced size and increased amount of teeth behind the snout tip in the mandible than spinosaurines, strong forelimbs, a huge sickle-curved claw on its "thumb", and strongly keeled front dorsal vertebrae. Spinosaurines are characterized by straight, unserrated and more widely spaced teeth, and the small size of their first premaxillary teeth. Sereno and colleagues pointed out that the more retracted nostrils in Irritator and the tall sail of Spinosaurus could also be unique traits of spinosaurines, though material from other taxa is needed to know for sure. As with Suchomimus, the claw of Baryonyx had been the first discovered fossil of the animal. Sereno and colleagues in 1998 analyzed the distribution of forty-five traits to produce a cladogram that showed Suchomimus and Baryonyx to be distinct but closely related. Later, Barker and colleagues, in 2021, created a new tribe within Baryonychinae: Ceratosuchopsini, a clade that includes Ceratosuchops, Riparovenator and Suchomimus.

The following phylogenetic tree shows a 2009 analysis of the Megalosauroidea.

Evolution 

Spinosaurids appear to have been widespread from the Barremian to the Cenomanian stages of the Cretaceous period, about 130 to 95 million years ago, while the oldest known spinosaurid remains date to the Middle Jurassic. They shared features such as long, narrow, crocodile-like skulls; sub-circular teeth, with fine to no serrations; the terminal rosette of the snout; and a secondary palate that made them more resistant to torsion. In contrast, the primitive and typical condition for theropods was a tall, narrow snout with blade-like (ziphodont) teeth with serrated carinae. The skull adaptations of spinosaurids converged with those of Crocodilians; early members of the latter group had skulls similar to typical theropods, later developing elongated snouts, conical teeth, and secondary palates. These adaptations may have been the result of a dietary change from terrestrial prey to fish. Unlike crocodiles, the post-cranial skeletons of baryonychine spinosaurids do not appear to have aquatic adaptations. Sereno and colleagues proposed in 1998 that the large thumb-claw and robust forelimbs of spinosaurids evolved in the Middle Jurassic, before the elongation of the skull and other adaptations related to fish-eating, since the former features are shared with their megalosaurid relatives. They also suggested that the spinosaurines and baryonychines diverged before the Barremian age of the Early Cretaceous.

Several hypotheses have been proposed about the biogeography of the spinosaurids. Since Suchomimus was more closely related to Baryonyx (from Europe) than to Spinosaurus—although that genus also lived in Africa—the distribution of spinosaurids cannot be explained as vicariance resulting from continental rifting. Sereno and colleagues proposed that spinosaurids were initially distributed across the supercontinent Pangea, but split with the opening of the Tethys Sea. Spinosaurines would then have evolved in the south (Africa and South America: in Gondwana) and baryonychines in the north (Europe: in Laurasia), with Suchomimus the result of a single north-to-south dispersal event. Buffetaut and the Tunisian palaeontologist Mohamed Ouaja also suggested in 2002 that baryonychines could be the ancestors of spinosaurines, which appear to have replaced the former in Africa. Milner suggested in 2003 that spinosaurids originated in Laurasia during the Jurassic, and dispersed via the Iberian land bridge into Gondwana, where they radiated. In 2007, Buffetaut pointed out that palaeogeographical studies had demonstrated that Iberia was near northern Africa during the Early Cretaceous, which he found to confirm Milner's idea that the Iberian region was a stepping stone between Europe and Africa, which is supported by the presence of baryonychines in Iberia. The direction of the dispersal between Europe and Africa is still unknown, and subsequent discoveries of spinosaurid remains in Asia and possibly Australia indicate that it may have been complex. The findings of Barker et al. (2021) are consistent with Milner's findings, where Spinosauridae arose in Europe and there were at least two migrations to Africa.

Palaeobiology 

Charig and Milner had proposed a piscivorous (fish-eating) diet for the closely related Baryonyx in 1986. This was later confirmed in 1997 with the discovery of partially digested fish scales found in the Baryonyx holotype. In 1998 Sereno and colleagues suggested the same dietary preference for Suchomimus, based on its elongated jaws, spoon-shaped terminal rosette, and long teeth reminiscent of those of piscivorous crocodilians. American palaeontologist Thomas Holtz noted that spinosaurid teeth were adapted for grasping rather than slicing, hence their reduced serrations, which in most other theropods were more prominent. Suchomimus's extensive secondary palate, which would have made the roof of the mouth more solid, allowed it to better resist twisting forces exerted by prey. The rest of Suchomimus's body was not particularly adapted to the water. The discovery of Suchomimus revealed that spinosaurid skulls were significantly shallower, more elongated and narrow than previously thought.

The use of the robust forelimbs and giant claws of spinosaurs remains a debated topic. Charig and Milner speculated in 1986 that Baryonyx may have crouched by the riverbank and used its claws to gaff fish out of the water, similarly to Grizzly bears. In 1987, British biologist Andrew Kitchener hypothesized a use in scavenging carcasses, though this has been critiqued by other researchers who pointed out that in most cases, a carcass would have already been largely emptied out by its initial predators. A 2005 study by Canadian paleontologist François Therrien and colleagues posited that spinosaur forelimbs were probably used for hunting larger prey items, given that their snouts could not resist the bending stress. In a 2017 review of the family, David Hone and Holtz also considered possible functions in digging for water sources or hard to reach prey, as well as burrowing into soil to construct nests. 

A 2022 study comparing the bone densities of Suchomimus, Baryonyx and Spinosaurus reveals that spinosaurids had ecologically disparate lifestyles. Suchomimus itself was more adapted to a life hunting in shallow water due to its hollow bones, while Baryonyx and Spinosaurus were capable of fully submerging underwater and diving after prey. Courtesy of denser bones, the latter two spinosaurids could hunt underwater for prey and occupy a more derived lifestyle than Suchomimus could.

Palaeoecology 

The Elrhaz Formation, part of the Tegama Group, consists mainly of fluvial sandstones with low relief, much of which is obscured by sand dunes. The sediments are coarse- to medium-grained, with almost no fine-grained horizons. Suchomimus lived in what is now Niger, during the late Aptian to early Albian stages of the Early Cretaceous, 112 million years ago. The sediment layers of the formation have been interpreted as an inland habitat of extensive freshwater floodplains and fast-moving rivers, with a tropical climate that likely experienced seasonal dry periods.

This environment was home to a variety of fauna including dinosaurs, pterosaurs, turtles, fish, hybodont sharks, and freshwater bivalves. Suchomimus coexisted with other theropods like the abelisaurid Kryptops palaios, the carcharodontosaurid Eocarcharia dinops, and an unknown noasaurid. Herbivorous dinosaurs of the region included iguanodontians like Ouranosaurus nigeriensis, Elrhazosaurus nigeriensis, Lurdusaurus arenatus, and two sauropods: Nigersaurus taqueti, and an unnamed titanosaur. Crocodylomorphs were abundant; represented by the giant pholidosaur species Sarcosuchus imperator, as well as small notosuchians like Anatosuchus minor, Araripesuchus wegeneri, and Stolokrosuchus lapparenti. The local flora probably consisted mainly of ferns, horsetails, and angiosperms, based on the dietary adaptations of the large diplodocoids that lived there.

References

External links 

 Paul Sereno – Project Exploration Suchomimus Fact Sheet, at Project Exploration.
 Photos of Suchomimus Skeleton in Niger, at Project Exploration.
 Video of mounted Suchomimus skeleton in Chicago at the Field Museum

Albian life
Aptian life
Cretaceous Niger
Early Cretaceous dinosaurs of Africa
Fossil taxa described in 1998
Fossils of Niger
Spinosaurids
Taxa named by Paul Sereno